Hahner is a German surname. Notable people with the surname include:

Anna Hahner (born 1989), German long-distance runner
Lisa Hahner (born 1989), German long-distance runner, twin sister of Anna

German-language surnames